Thomas A. Palangio (born June 14, 1962 in Providence, Rhode Island) is an American politician and was a Democratic member of the Rhode Island House of Representatives representing District 3 from 2013 to 2017 and District 8 from 1993 until 2002.

Education
Palangio attended the Community College of Rhode Island and graduated from Rhode Island College.

Elections
2012 When District 3 Democratic Representative Edith Ajello was redistricted to District 1, Palangio was unopposed for the September 11, 2012 Democratic Primary, winning with 399 votes and won the November 6, 2012 General election with 2,710 votes (91.2%) against Republican nominee Rufus Bailey.
1992 Palangio won the September 15, 1992 Democratic Primary and won the November 3, 1992 General election with 2,853 votes (86.2%) against Republican nominee Thomas Shola.
1994 Palangio was challenged in the September 13, 1994 Democratic Primary, but won, and was unopposed for the November 8, 1994 General election, winning with 2,312 votes.
1996 Palangio was unopposed for both the September 10, 1996 Democratic Primary and the November 5, 1996 General election, winning with 2,312 votes.
1998 Palangio was unopposed for both the September 15, 1998 Democratic Primary and the November 3, 1998 General election, winning with 2,312 votes.
2000 Palangio was unopposed for both the September 12, 2000 Democratic Primary, winning with 529 votes and the November 7, 2000 General election, winning with 2,225 votes.

References

External links
Official page at the Rhode Island General Assembly

Thomas Palangio at Ballotpedia
Thomas A. Palangio at OpenSecrets

1962 births
Living people
Community College of Rhode Island alumni
Democratic Party members of the Rhode Island House of Representatives
Politicians from Providence, Rhode Island
Rhode Island College alumni
Rhode Island lawyers
21st-century American politicians